UFC on ESPN: Blaydes vs. Volkov (also known as UFC on ESPN 11 and UFC Vegas 3) was a mixed martial arts event produced by the Ultimate Fighting Championship that took place on June 20, 2020 at the UFC Apex facility in Enterprise, Nevada, part of the Las Vegas Metropolitan Area, United States.

Background
The event was initially scheduled to take place at the SaskTel Centre in Saskatoon, Saskatchewan, Canada. Due to the COVID-19 pandemic, UFC president Dana White announced on April 9 that starting with UFC 249, all future events were indefinitely postponed. The event would have marked the promotion's second visit to Saskatoon, following UFC Fight Night: Holloway vs. Oliveira in August 2015. On May 21, the UFC announced the cancelation of the event in Canada.

A heavyweight bout between Curtis Blaydes and former Bellator Heavyweight Champion Alexander Volkov served as the event headliner.

A welterweight bout between former Bellator Welterweight Champion Lyman Good and Belal Muhammad was previously expected to take place at UFC 205 in November 2016, but Good was pulled from that event after being notified by the United States Anti-Doping Agency (USADA) due to a potential anti-doping violation stemming from an out-of-competition drug test. The matchup was once again booked for UFC 249 in April 2020, but Good pulled out due to testing positive for COVID-19, being the first fighter to publicly acknowledge the fact. They ultimately met at this event instead.

Joe Solecki was expected to face Austin Hubbard at the event. However, Solecki was removed from the pairing on June 13 for undisclosed reasons. He was replaced by promotional newcomer Max Rohskopf.

Matt Frevola was scheduled to face Frank Camacho at the event. However, Frevola was pulled from the fight during the week leading up to the event after teammate and cornerman, Billy Quarantillo, tested positive for COVID-19. Despite two negative tests, Frevola was removed from the bout in an abundance of caution. Promotional newcomer Justin Jaynes was tabbed as a replacement to face Camacho.

At the weigh-ins, Frank Camacho weighed in at 158 pounds, two pounds over the lightweight non-title fight limit. The bout proceeded at a catchweight and Camacho was fined 20% of his purse, which went to his opponent Justin Jaynes.

Results

Bonus awards
The following fighters received $50,000 bonuses.
Fight of the Night: Josh Emmett vs. Shane Burgos
Performance of the Night:  Jim Miller and Justin Jaynes

Reported payout
The following is the reported payout to the fighters as reported to the Nevada State Athletic Commission (NSAC). It does not include sponsor money and also does not include the UFC's traditional "fight night" bonuses. The total disclosed payout for the event was $1,655,000.

 Curtis Blaydes: $180,000 (includes $90,000 win bonus) def. Alexander Volkov: $80,000
 Josh Emmett: $152,000 (includes $76,000 win bonus) def. Shane Burgos: $75,000
 Raquel Pennington: $126,000 (includes $63,000 win bonus) def. Marion Reneau: $38,000
 Belal Muhammad: $100,000 (includes $50,000 win bonus) def. Lyman Good: $28,000
 Jim Miller: $208,000 (includes $104,000 win bonus) def. Roosevelt Roberts: $25,000
 Bobby Green: $72,000 (includes $36,000 win bonus) def. Clay Guida: $73,000
 Tecia Torres: $96,000 (includes $48,000 win bonus) def. Brianna Van Buren: $14,000
 Marc-André Barriault: $28,000 (includes $14,000 win bonus) def. Oskar Piechota: $20,000
 Gillian Robertson: $50,000 (includes $25,000 win bonus) def. Cortney Casey: $53,000
 Justin Jaynes: $29,000 (includes $12,000 win bonus) def. Frank Camacho: $20,000 ^
 Lauren Murphy: $76,000 (includes $38,000 win bonus) def. Roxanne Modafferi: $50,000
 Austin Hubbard: $50,000 (includes $25,000 win bonus) def. Max Rohskopf: $12,000

^ Camacho ($5,000) was fined 20% of his purse for failing to make the required weight limit for his fight. That money was issued to his opponent, a NSAC official confirmed.

Aftermath
On August 5, it was announced that the NSAC issued a temporary suspension for Marc-André Barriault, after he tested positive for ostarine in his drug test associated with the event. The suspension would hold until a full disciplinary hearing at the next NSAC meeting, expected to take place in September. Four months later, Barriault was officially suspended for nine months retroactive to the date of the fight, with the result of the bout being overturned to a no contest due to the violation. He was fined $2,100 and before he is re-licensed in Las Vegas, Barriault will also have to pay a prosecution fee of $254.38.

See also 

 List of UFC events
 List of current UFC fighters
 2020 in UFC

References 
 

UFC on ESPN
Mixed martial arts in Canada
Sports competitions in Saskatoon
2020 in sports in Nevada
Mixed martial arts in Las Vegas
Sports competitions in Las Vegas
June 2020 sports events in the United States